Cheick Oumar Souaré (born 3  September 2002) is a French professional footballer who plays as a midfielder for Ligue 1 club Marseille.

Early life 
Born in Arras, Pas-de-Calais, he started playing football with FC Martigues in the south of France, aged seven. He later played for FC Istres, before joining Marseille in 2015. He signed his first professional contract with the club in June 2020.

Club career 
He was first included in Marseile's squad in February 2021, as the club was going on a losing streak with several internal tensions and supporters riots, eventually leading to the departure of André Villas-Boas.

Cheick Souaré made his professional debut for Olympique de Marseille on the 3 February 2021, coming up as a substitute in the 2–2 draw against Lens.

International career
Born in France, Souaré is of Guinean descent. He is a youth international for France.

References

External links
 France profile at FFF
 OM profile
 

2002 births
Living people
Sportspeople from Arras
French footballers
France youth international footballers
French sportspeople of Guinean descent
Association football midfielders
Olympique de Marseille players
Ligue 1 players
Championnat National 2 players
Black French sportspeople
Footballers from Hauts-de-France
Footballers from Provence-Alpes-Côte d'Azur
Sportspeople from Bouches-du-Rhône